Bradley Green is a hamlet in Cheshire West and Chester, England.

In 2015, the ancient parish of Bradley, of which Bradley Green was the chief settlement, was abolished to form part of the current parish.

Nearby at grid reference  is a deserted medieval village. The site, which aerial photography has shown to have small house platforms and a former road, is a Scheduled Ancient Monument.

See also 
 Listed buildings in Bradley, Cheshire

References

Hamlets in Cheshire
Former populated places in Cheshire
Archaeological sites in Cheshire